University of Jiroft (دانشگاه جيرفت, Danushgah-e Jireft) is a public, coeducational research university in Jiroft, Iran.

The University of Jiroft was established more than 30 years ago. This university launched its educational and research activities in 1988 as a college of Shahid Bahonar University, upon receiving the principled agreement of the Council for the Development of Higher Education.

The university has completed its development processes in the past years with the promotion from a faculty, complex, and ultimately university rank. In 2009, this was a new chapter for the scientific and educational developments in the south of Kerman province when the Jiroft Agriculture College turned to the University of Jiroft.

Some unique characteristics of the region, such as having a rich 5,000 year old civilization, diverse climatic and geographical areas, and locating in one of the main agricultural and mineral productive areas in the country have provided the University of Jiroft an opportunity to be as a hub of developing knowledge and technology in the south east of Iran.

Having five faculties and 36 disciplines with 3500 undergraduate and graduate students, the University of Jiroft has managed to establish the educational and research infrastructure, and largely contributed to training of the elite alumnus and developing science and technology in the country.

The presence of 105 full-time faculty members has not only fostered the quality of education, but also played an enormous role in creating a dynamic research environment for science and technology.

A high fraction of graduated students of the university are selected for the top ranked universities in the country. This indicates the high quality of the education in this university.

One of the research themes of the university as an educational comprehensive center has always been sustainable development in the south of Kerman Province. 
In the national and regional levels, the University of Jiroft has signed different cooperation agreements with other top universities, research centers, and governmental organizations. All of these agreements have been along with the national and regional research needs and priorities.

In the international level, the university has also provided an appropriate platform to have collaborations and cooperation with top class universities in the world such as:  the University of Milan and University of Padova in Italy, Harvard University and the University of Pennsylvania in the US, Deccan College and Rai University in India, the University of Warsaw in Poland, Madrid University in Spain, University of Tübingen in Germany, as well as Ghent in Belgium.

The University of Jiroft in a ten-year horizon will be an entrepreneurial and skilled-oriented university among the top universities in the region and play a leading role in the sustainable development of southern Kerman Province and the region.

Jiroft County
Universities in Iran